Dennis Cleveland Stewart (July 29, 1947 – April 20, 1994) was an American actor and dancer. Best known for Grease (1978), and Grease 2 (1983), and Sgt Pepper's Lonely Hearts Club Band (1978).

Early life
Stewart was born in Los Angeles, California on July 29, 1947.

Career
Dennis was known for playing Leo "Craterface" Balmudo, the Scorpions' gang leader in Grease (1978),  and reprised the role in Grease 2 (1982). He also appeared as a dancer in Sgt Pepper's Lonely Hearts Club Band, highly visible in the Maxwell's Silver Hammer scene with Steve Martin.

Death
Stewart was diagnosed with HIV in 1993 and died from pneumonia as a result of complications from AIDS in 1994.

Filmography

Film

Television

References

External links
 

1994 deaths
AIDS-related deaths in California
Deaths from pneumonia in California
1947 births